= Pobreng Alindahaw =

"Pobreng Alindahaw" is a Filipino folk-song, originating in the Visayan ethnic group. It is sometimes sung during special occasions such as birthday parties. It was also featured in the title of a 1970s movie.

The word 'Pobreng' means 'poor', and 'alindahaw' actually means rain, when it should be 'alindanaw', a dragonfly, an error that went unnoticed by most if not all people. The lyrics chronicle the dragonfly flying amongst trees and flowers.

The song is divided into two sections - the first in the key of G major, the second in G minor.
